Phonophobia, also called ligyrophobia or sonophobia, is a fear of or aversion to loud sounds (for example firecrackers)—a type of specific phobia. It is a very rare phobia which is often the symptom of hyperacusis.  Sonophobia can refer to the hypersensitivity of a patient to sound and can be part of the diagnosis of a migraine.
Occasionally it is called acousticophobia.

The term phonophobia comes from Greek φωνή - phōnē, "voice" or "sound" and φόβος - phobos, "fear".

Ligyrophobics may be fearful of devices that can suddenly emit loud sounds, such as computer speakers or fire alarms. When operating a device such as a home theater system, computer, television, or CD player, they may wish to have the volume turned down all the way before doing anything that would cause the speakers to emit sound, so that once the command to produce sound is given, the user can raise the volume of the speakers to a comfortable listening level. They may avoid parades and carnivals due to the loud instruments such as drums. As festive occasions are accompanied by music of over 120 decibels, many phobics develop agoraphobia. Other ligyrophobics also steer clear of any events in which firecrackers are to be let off.

Another example is watching someone blow up a balloon beyond its normal capacity. This is often an unsettling, even disturbing thing for a person with ligyrophobia to observe, as they anticipate a loud sound when the balloon pops. When balloons pop, two types of reactions are heavy breathing and panic attacks. The sufferer becomes anxious to get away from the source of the loud sound and may get headaches. It may also be related to, caused by, or confused with hyperacusis, extreme sensitivity to loud sounds. Phonophobia also has been proposed to refer to an extreme form of misophonia.

See also
 Astraphobia – fear of thunder
 Misophonia – irrational 'hatred' or disgust expressed towards specific sounds
 Globophobia - the fear of balloons, which is commonly linked to phonophobia
 List of phobias

References

External links 

Phobias
Sound
Noise
Psychoacoustics